John Downer (1843–1915) was an Australian politician.

John Downer may also refer to:

John Downer (equestrian) (1881–1977), American equestrian
John Downer (filmmaker) (born 1952), British film director and producer
John Downer (sign painter) (born 1951), American designer

See also
John Downes (disambiguation)
John Langdon Down (1828–1896), British physician